The Little Ark is a 1972 children's film directed by James B. Clark, produced by Robert B. Radnitz for Cinema Center Films and released theatrically in the U.S. by National General Pictures. It stars Geneviève Ambas and Philip Frame as children, believed to be World War II orphans, that befriend a local fisherman (Theodore Bikel) after he saves them from a flood.

Cast
 Theodore Bikel as The Captain
 Geneviève Ambas as Adinda
 Philip Frame as Jan
 Max Croiset as Father Grijpma
 Truus Dekker as Mother Grijpma

Awards
Composer Fred Karlin and lyricist Megan Karlin were nominated for the Academy Award for Best Original Song for "Come Follow, Follow Me."

Reception
In Leonard Maltin's Movie Guide, he gave the film three stars and wrote, "Another good children's film from producer Robert Radnitz; this one concerns two Dutch youngsters who try to find their father after being separated from him during a flood."

See also
 List of American films of 1972

References

External links
 
 

1972 films
1970s adventure films
American children's adventure films
Films directed by James B. Clark
Films scored by Fred Karlin
Cinema Center Films films
1970s English-language films
1970s American films
Flood films